The Malaysia national football team represents Malaysia in international football and is controlled by the Football Association of Malaysia. The national team is recognised by FIFA as the successor of the defunct Malaya national football team which was founded for the 1963 Merdeka Tournament one month before the institution of Malaysia. The team is officially nicknamed Harimau Malaya in reference to the Malayan Tiger.

Consisting of the group of 4 teams (the other three being Singapore, Vietnam and Thailand) of Southeast Asia who have each won the ASEAN Football Championship at least once, having won it once, Malaysia has however failed to reach wins outside their region other than a bronze won at the Asian Games in 1974. Having participated in the Summer Olympics once and three AFC Asian Cups, the team has never progressed beyond the group stage.

Malaysia's biggest opponents on the international stage are its geographical neighbours – Indonesia, Thailand, Vietnam and Singapore – with past matches produced and in particular, fixtures involving Indonesia being the most heated among these that corresponds to political and social issues, named as 'Nusantara Derby'. Since the 2020s, Malaysia significantly uses naturalised players of various different nationalities in an attempt to improve the prospects of its national football team.

Etymology 
The Harimau Malaya nickname has been used by the team's predecessor, Malaya national football team. The nickname referred to the national animal of Malaysia, the Malayan tiger. Another source stated the name was believed to have been derived from a Malayan football player from Stulang Laut, Johor named Abdullah Mohd Don (Dollah Don). The player had been called "Harimau Malaya" by the founding father of Indonesia, Sukarno when he managed to equalise against an Indonesian football club by scoring a hat-trick in a match between Singaporean Malay Club and Peseja (Persija Jakarta) in 1953 after trailing 3 goals behind them.

History

Early years (1963–1969) 

Prior to 16 September 1963, North Borneo (now Sabah), Sarawak, Malaya and Singapore were represented by their own national teams, a situation which pre-dated the establishment Malaysia. Malaya and Singapore often competed in international competitions such as the Merdeka Tournament while North Borneo and Sarawak competed in Borneo Cup. Malaya's biggest achievement in football was becoming the bronze medalist of the 1962 Asian Games held in Jakarta, Indonesia after defeating South Vietnam 4–1 lead by Abdul Ghani Minhat, who at that time was the first Asian player to reach 50 goals for the men's national teams.

The beginning of the Malaysian football team match took place in Merdeka Stadium on 8 August 1963 with the combined strength of Singapore and Malaya (although the federation only existed after 16 September 1963). With the combined forces of Malaya and Singapore, the team began by facing Japan, and lost 3–4. The team continued to use a combination of players from Singapore and Malay Peninsula until the formation of the Malaysia team, wherein the Football Association of Malaya was succeeded by the Football Association of Malaysia (FAM). The combination players with Singapore ended when the latter separated from Malaysia along with the establishment of Football Association of Singapore (FAS) and their subsequent reaffiliation with FIFA in 1965. Since then the squad was only represented by West Malaysian players, mainly due to travel time difficulties to East Malaysia and the players were not well known to the mainstream West Malaysian football. From 1966 to 1970, Chow Chee Keong was voted by Asian Football Confederation as the best Asian's goalkeeper for 5 straight years.

Olympic Tournament & Asia Competition (1970–1980) 
In 1971, James Wong of Sabah was the first player from East Malaysia to represent the country. Malaysia qualified for the 1972 Olympics in Munich, beating Japan 3–0, South Korea 1–0, Taiwan 3–0 and the Philippines 5–0 along the way. Although they managed to defeat the United States 3–0, they lost the other two matches with a score of 0–3 to West Germany and 0–6 to Morocco, ranking 10th in the final standings. Since 1972, Mokhtar Dahari has been considered a legendary football player for the Malaysian team maintaining his place as one of the best players in Asia. He manage to score a total of 125 goals in 167 appearances for Malaysia (including matches played against club sides, national 'B' teams and selection teams). Against other nations' national 'A' teams, he scored 89 goals in 142 appearances. This makes him once the world's top scorer for men's national teams.

Together with the record of Soh Chin Ann. According to both RSSSF and IFFHS, Soh is the player with the most international caps in men's football and become the first men's footballers to reach 200 or more international caps. Two years later, Malaysia won their second bronze medal at the 1974 Asian Games after defeating North Korea 2–1. The team went on to qualify twice in a row for the AFC Asian Cup, in 1976 and 1980. It was only in 1977; when the FAM sent a talent scout to the East. The list continued by the late James Yaakub of Sarawak in 1977. The team also won the Merdeka Tournament four times, became runner-up three times and achieved third place twice during the 1970s. Malaysia qualified again for the 1980 Olympics in Moscow, beating Indonesia 6–1, South Korea 3–0, Brunei 3–1, Philippines 8–0 and tied
with Japan 1–1. Thus, the team meet south korea in the play-off match. Malaysia won the play-off against South Korea with a 2–1 scored in the Merdeka Stadium and qualified but joined the US-led boycott of the games as the Malaysian government made a decision to protest the Soviet Union's invasion of Afghanistan.

1976 AFC Asian Cup Group A 

Malaysia participated the 1976 AFC Asian Cup for the first time, meeting Kuwait and China in Group A. During the tournament, Malaysia came in last in the group, losing 0–2 to Kuwait in the opening match but managed to hold China to a 1–1 draw in the second match.

1980 AFC Asian Cup Group B 

Malaysia made its second Asian Cup appearance in 1980, placed in Group B alongside South Korea, Kuwait, and the United Arab Emirates. They managed to hold South Korea 1–1 in the first match, but would lose 1–3 to Kuwait before regaining a 2–0 victory against United Arab Emirates. Malaysia would eventually finish 3rd after holding Qatar 1–1 in their last match.

Falling performances and drought (1990–2009) 

In 1994, Malaysian football was embroiled in one of the largest bribery scandals in the country. With the dearth of mainstream interest and lack of funds, Malaysian football has failed to repeat the performances of the 1970s and 1980s to qualify into major tournaments, despite the recruitment of Claude LeRoy. Allan Harris appointed as a new head coach in 2001. Harris came with strong credentials, having assisted Terry Venables at FC Barcelona. In the second half of 2004, FAM appoint Bertalan Bicskei, former Hungarian goalkeeper and national coach, to succeed Allan Harris. Bicskei led the national side to third place at the regional Tiger Cup tournament, but was demoted to youth development duties by FAM for his actions during a friendly against Singapore in Penang on 8 June 2005. Bicskei, disgusted by the standard of officiating, threw a bottle onto the pitch before confronting a Singapore player. In September 2005, his contract was terminated after a mutual agreement.

Norizan Bakar became the next head coach of the Malaysian team. He guided the Malaysian squad to the 2007 AFF Championship semifinals in 2007, where Malaysia lost through penalties to Singapore. Norizan's position as the head coach was criticised by the Malaysian football community, fans and officials alike, after the team's performances during the 2007 AFC Asian Cup as co-host of the edition, where Malaysia lost to China 1–5, Uzbekistan 0–5 and Iran 0–2. After the removal of Norizan Bakar, B. Sathianathan took over as head coach. Although he guided the squad to win the 2007 Merdeka Tournament, Malaysia once again failed to qualify for the World Cup after losing 1–4 and drawing 0–0 with Bahrain in the qualifying round. In March 2008, Sathianathan once again reach the final of the Merdeka Tournament. However, Malaysia lost on penalties to Vietnam. Sathianathan also led Malaysia to the semi finals of the 2008 Myanmar Grand Royal Challenge Cup. However, Malaysia then shockingly lost 1–4 to eventual winners, Myanmar.

During the 2008 AFF Championship, Malaysia started their campaign with a 3–0 win over Laos, but were defeated in the second match by Vietnam with a score of 2–3 and were finally eliminated when they lost 0–3 to Thailand in the final match of the group stage. This was the first time that the Malaysian squad had not passed through the group stages in 12 years. There are also reports that match-fixing and bribery that infiltrate the Malaysian football in the 1994 are returned. In the 2011 Asian Cup qualifiers, the Malaysian team lost 0–5 to the United Arab Emirates. This defeat was the final straw in the eyes of Malaysian supporters, and in February 2009, the contracts of Sathianathan and manager Soh Chin Ann were terminated.

AFF Championship triumph (2010) 

In April 2009, K. Rajagopal was named the new coach of Malaysia replacing B. Sathianathan and took over the position in July 2009, of which he also looked after the Malaysia under-23 squad. Rajagopal's first match was against Zimbabwe, which Malaysia won 4–0. Rajagopal also coached Malaysia in two games against visiting English champions, Manchester United, losing both matches 2–3 and 0–2. During his time as the coach of the Under-23 team, Rajagopal led Malaysia to their fifth SEA Games gold medal and also led Malaysia to qualify for the second round of the 2010 Asian Games as one of the best four third-placed teams after a lapse of 32 years.

During the 2010 AFF Championship, a total of 14 Malaysia's players were under the age of 23. Placed in group A and lost the first match to host Indonesia 1–5, Malaysia bounced back from defeat drawing Thailand and beating Laos 5–1. As runner up of group, Malaysia qualified for the semi finals to meet Group B winners and defending champions Vietnam. In the first leg of the semifinal, Malaysia won 2–0 on home soil and later drew 0–0 in the second leg, advancing to the final with an aggregate of 2–0. An opportunity of revenge opened up in the finals as Malaysia again met Indonesia, who were unbeaten in all previous matches.

On the first leg of the finals at home, Malaysia won 3–0. Malaysia scored twice through Safee Sali and once through Mohd Ashaari Shamsuddin on a night when Bukit Jalil National Stadium was filled over capacity for the first time since it was built. The match attracted so many people that after tickets were sold out, policemen manning the gates were seen allowing friends and relatives into the stadium, causing people having to trespass onto the cable bridge above the electronic display besides standing on the aisles and corridors to view the game. On the second leg of the finals that was held in Jakarta, Malaysia lost 1–2 to Indonesia but the final aggregate was 4–2 to Malaysia, thus Malaysia were awarded the title. It was the first time in history that Malaysia were crowned the champions of AFF Championship and a trophy in the international stage.

Stagnation (2011–present) 
Since the 2010s, the expectations of improved performances rose, but the team still failed to deliver any new high achievements or set new records. In June 2014, Dollah Salleh replaced Rajagobal as the head coach after his contract has ended. Dollah guided Malaysia to the final of the 2014 AFF Championship but failed to replicate the same form as the previous head coach. In the following international fixtures, the coach has also recorded 0–6 losses to Oman and Palestine as well as 1–1 draw against Timor-Leste. However, the 0–10 defeat to the United Arab Emirates, Malaysia's worst ever defeat in 50 years, prompted his resignation as the head coach. The place was taken by interim coach Ong Kim Swee who was later promoted as the head coach until the end of March 2017. The official coaching post then was taken over by Portuguese coach Nelo Vingada in the hopes of raising the Malaysian football performances. On 13 June, Malaysia played their first match in the 2019 AFC Asian Cup qualification against Lebanon. Despite having a 1–0 lead during the first half, they eventually lost the match with a score 1–2. Malaysia's poor performance however, continued. Despite given high hopes and expectations from the match against Hong Kong, Malaysia only managed a 1–1 draw, before losing to the same team 0–2 in Hong Kong. As for the result, frustration happened in the team and Malaysia suffered two consecutive defeats against North Korea, with both matches ended 1–4. Malaysia also lost the second final match against Lebanon in Beirut by 1–2. With only 1 draw and 5 defeats, Malaysia was subsequently eliminated from the qualification. The coaching position was taken over by the team assistant coach Tan Cheng Hoe in late 2017 after Vingada stepped down following a string of poor results.

After failure to qualify for the 2019 AFC Asian Cup, Malaysia proceeded its journey in the 2018 AFF Championship and was grouped with rival Vietnam together with Myanmar, Laos and Cambodia. Malaysia won the second place with three wins and only one loss against Vietnam. By qualifying as group runners-up, Malaysia faced Thailand, the fierce rival in their long-time head-to-head records as well the reigning champions in the tournament, where they were able to overcome the latter by holding them 2–2 in Thailand's home stadium of Bangkok, winning the match by away goals rule in one of the tournament's greatest shock despite being tied 0–0 earlier at home. In the finals, they met Vietnam again and held the latter 2–2 at home before losing 0–1 in Vietnam's home ground of Hanoi, subsequently finishing the tournament with an aggregate of 2–3 as the runners-up for the third time in their AFF Cup history. Despite being unable to achieve the AFF Cup the second time, the enhancing performance of Malaysia was seen with the emergence of new talents coming from its youth football development which brought a hope in future.

Malaysia participated in 2022 World Cup campaign from the first round due to poor record previously, but with its first opponent was only Timor-Leste, Malaysia easily destroyed the Timorese 12–2 on aggregate. There, they joined the second round where the team was surprisingly grouped in a group containing three other Southeast Asian rivals Thailand, Indonesia and Vietnam; alongside the United Arab Emirates. Malaysia opened their game with a 3–2 comeback victory over rival Indonesia in a match with full scandal and strong Anti-Malaysian sentiment among Indonesians. It was followed by an unlucky 1–2 home loss to the UAE, and to add the irony, Malaysia took the lead from early minute only to see itself being beaten at home. The next encounter against rival Vietnam in Hanoi, which was the rematch of 2018 AFF Championship, ended with another Malaysian defeat as the Malay Tigers fell 0–1. However, Malaysia has not been eliminated as the team can still get an opportunity to qualify further. Then, Malaysia managed one of the most famous victories in their FIFA World Cup campaign, beating neighbor and regional powerhouse Thailand 2–1 at home to keep its dream alive. Malaysia boosted its confidence with its victory over Thailand to overcome a demoralized Indonesia, also at home, 2–0, to occupy second spot behind Vietnam and above Thailand.

Following Malaysia's failure to qualify for the semi-finals of the AFF Cup 2020 in Singapore, Tan Cheng Hoe resigned as the head coach of Football Association of Malaysia. On 21 January 2022, South Korean national Kim Pan-gon was hired as the new national team head coach. On 26 March 2022, Malaysia lost against Singapore 2–1 as part of the 2022 FAS Tri-Nations Series.

2023 AFC Asian Cup qualification 
Under Kim Pan-gon, Malaysia started their campaign with a 3–1 win over Turkmenistan. It was followed by an 1–2 loss to Bahrain; in which Bahrain took back the lead with a late penalty after Malaysia had equalised. However, Malaysia won 4–1 against Bangladesh in their final match, thus placing second in the group overall. This resulted in Malaysia succeeding to qualify for the 2023 AFC Asian Cup, 15 years after their last appearance as hosts of the 2007 edition, which granted automated qualification.

Team image

Media coverage 
All matches of Malaysia are shown live on Astro Arena (friendlies, World Cup (2nd round only), and Media Prima (Asian Cup qualifiers), RTM (AFF Championship matches (except 2014 season), World Cup and Asian Cup qualifiers), and (AFF Championship matches for 2014 season only). All matches are broadcast with both English (Astro only) and Malaysian commentary.

Kits 

From the 1970s to 2007, the national team kit was manufactured and sponsored by Adidas. Since 2007, the official Malaysia team kit is manufactured by Nike. The home kit design of black and yellow stripes is a throwback to the kit used by Malayan national team in the 1920s. The national team of the 1970s also sported similar stripes, which are supposed to be reminiscent of the stripes of a tiger.

In November 2010, Nike Malaysia created a new football kit specially made for the 2010 AFF Championship. The home kit's design of black and yellow stripes is shaped by a black row of lines. The away kit features a plain blue front and red and white at the edge of the sleeves. Nike used the Malaysian flag as their logo instead of putting the Football Association of Malaysia logo to remembering the team success in the 1970s. On the underside of the flag, the quote "Tanah Tumpahnya Darahku" (The land that I spill my blood for) can be found. The quote is part of the Malaysia National Anthem, alluding that they are doing their best for the country.

The practice of using the flag on the kits ended when Malaysia got a new kit in late 2016. They have the FAM logo on the kits.

Grounds 

Home Stadium

Malaysia's home stadium is the Bukit Jalil National Stadium. The stadium capacity is 87,411 (seated) which makes it the ninth largest football stadium in the world. Malaysia's previous national stadium was the Merdeka Stadium before the Bukit Jalil sports complex was constructed. Malaysia also uses other stadiums for their matches such as the Kuala Lumpur Stadium.

Training ground
Wisma FAM is the main headquarters for the Football Association of Malaysia which located at Kelana Jaya, Malaysia. The training facility for the Malaysia national football team also located at the Wisma FAM. Others than that, it also serves as a meeting point for the coaches and national players. Also equipped with a room for press statement and small apartment rooms available for the national players during the training camp. Sometimes, ticket matches also sold on this training facility.

Supporters 

Ultras Malaya is the name of the major supporters for the national team in Malaysia. They are known for their high fanaticism and support towards the national team. In every international match the national team played, they are found in a group standing at the supporters area. The main colours for these supporter are usually in black with a yellow scarf and banners just like the national team kits colours. These supporters always bring flares, drums and large national flags to the stadiums.

Sponsorship 
According to the website of Football Association of Malaysia, Malaysia main sponsors include Telekom Malaysia, Bank Islam, Yakult, Nike, 100plus, One Goal, MYCAT and Malaysia Airlines.

Rivalries 
Malaysia has rivalries with Indonesia, Singapore, Thailand and Vietnam. These rivalries are rooted in geographical closeness.

Indonesia is Malaysia's most heated rival and matches between two teams usually draw large supporters alike. The rivalry traces its background from the infamous Indonesia–Malaysia confrontation. Due to the strong nationalist sentiments in both sides, the rivalry has always been taken with high priority.

Singapore is Malaysia's only recent rival. Their rivalry is mostly rekindled only when it comes to the AFF Championship, and is also less heated than Malaysia's rivalry with Indonesia.

Thailand is Malaysia's other traditional rival, with matches between two teams also draw large supporters alike. Malaysia holds a significant distinction for being undefeated at home to Thailand since the 1990s, as well as having a better head-to-head record with 41 wins, 35 draws and 35 losses.

As South Vietnam, the Vietnamese side had a poorer performance, with only 3 wins, 3 draws and 7 losses, during that time the Malaysians posed as a formidable side in Southeast Asia. Since reintegration, however, Vietnam has overwhelmed in the head-to-head record against Malaysia with 14 wins, 3 draws and only 6 losses since 1991. Vietnam has also been maintaining the series of unbeaten match against Malaysia since 2014.

Results and fixtures

2022

2023

Coaching staff

Coaching record

Players

Current squad 

Recent call-ups 
The following players have been called up for the team within the last 12 months and are still available for selection.

Notes
INJ = It is not part of the current squad due to injury.
PRE = Preliminary squad.
WD = Player withdrew from the current squad due to non-injury issue. -->

Player records

Players in bold are still active with Malaysia. This list does not include players who represented Malaya (1948−1962).

Most appearances

Top goalscorers

Competitive record 

 Champion   Runners-up   Third place  
 Fourth place

FIFA World Cup

Olympic Games

AFC Asian Cup

AFF Championship

Asian Games

Southeast Asian Games 

 * : Denotes draws include knockout matches decided via penalty shoot-out.
 1 : Represented in the competition by Malaya national football team.
 2 : Represented in the competition by Malaysia national under-23 football team.
 3 : Not a FIFA 'A' international competition.
 4 : Represented in the competition by Malaysia national under-22 football team.
 5 : Previously known as Southeast Asian Peninsular Games (SEAP Games).
 B : Qualified to the final round, but boycotted the tournament.
 C : These matches are not regarded as part of the national team's record, nor are caps awarded.
 Q : Qualified to the final round of participating tournament
 S : Shared the medal

Notes:
 Red border colour indicates tournament was held on home soil

Head-to-head record 
Last update was against   on 10 January 2023.

FIFA ranking 
Last update was on 10 January 2023.
Source:

 Worst Ranking   Best Ranking   Worst Mover   Best Mover  

Notes
 Table above is a list of all FIFA 'A' international matches Malaysia have played against FIFA recognised teams.

Honours and achievements

Continental

Regional

Summary

Exhibition tournaments 
 Pestabola Merdeka
  Winners (7): 1968, 1973, 1974, 1976, 1979*, 1986, 1993
  Runners-up (6): 1969, 1972, 1975, 1980, 2000, 2008

 South Vietnam Independence Cup
  Winners (1): 1971
  Runners-up (3): 1965, 1966, 1973

 King's Cup
  Winners (4): 1972, 1976*, 1977*, 1978
  Runners-up (2): 1973, 2022
  Third-place (2): 1970, 1974

 Jakarta Anniversary Tournament
  Winners (1): 1970
  Runners-up (1): 1975

 Korea Cup
  Third-place (1): 1977*

 Indonesian Independence Cup
  Winners (1): 1992

 Sultan Hassanal Bolkiah Cup
  Runners-up (2): 1986, 1990

  AirMarine Cup
 Third-place (1): 2019

 Tri-Nations Series
  Runners-up (1): 2022

*trophy shared

See also 

 Malaysia national football team results
 Malaysia national under-23 football team
 Malaysia national under-22 football team
 Malaysia national under-19 football team
 Malaysia national under-16 football team
 Malaysia women's national football team
 Malaysia national futsal team
 Malaysia women's national futsal team
 Malaysia League XI
 Football Association of Malaysia
 List of Malaysia footballers born outside Malaysia

Notes

References

External links 
 Official website of the Football Association of Malaysia
 Malaysia national team on FIFA.com / News / Fixtures and results / Ranking / League (all archived)
 Malaysia national team on the-afc.com

 
Asian national association football teams
Football in Malaysia